The information regarding the (Chilean) river names from P-Z on this page has been compiled from the data supplied by GeoNames. It includes all features named "Rio", "Canal", "Arroyo", "Estero" and those Feature Code is associated with a stream of water.

Content
This list contains:
 Name of the stream, in Spanish Language
 Latitude and a link to a GeoNames map of the river
 Height (elevation) of the mouth in meters
 Other names for the same feature, if any

Notes

References

External links
 Rivers of Chile
 Base de Datos Hidrográfica de Chile

Lists of rivers of Chile